Craspedia aurantia,  is a flowering plant in the family Asteraceae and grows in New South Wales and Victoria. It has light green leaves and heads of yellow to reddish-brown flowers on a single flowering stem.

Description
The yellow to orange-brown flowers are borne in heads  in diameter with about 40-90 florets in each head.

Taxonomy and naming
Craspedia aurantia was first formally described in 1992 by Joy Everett and Joy Thompson and the description was published in Telopea. The specific epithet (aurantia) means "orange" in reference to the colour of the flowerheads.

Distribution and habitat
This species grows in alpine and subalpine grassland and heath in New South Wales and Victoria.

References

Gnaphalieae
Plants described in 1992
Flora of New South Wales
Flora of Victoria (Australia)